Mezher may refer to:

 Mezher, Lebanon, a town in the Matn District of the Mount Lebanon Governorate
 Alexandra Mezher (died 2016), a murdered Lebanese social worker 
 Ali Mezher (born 1994), a Lebanese basketball player

See also

Mazhar Khaleqi (born 1938), a Kurdish folk singer